Peter Henry Murdoch (17 June 1941 – 16 October 1995) was a New Zealand rugby union player. An inside back, Murdoch represented  at a provincial level, and was a member of the New Zealand national side, the All Blacks, in 1964 and 1965. He played five games at first five-eighth for the All Blacks, all of them Test matches, scoring two tries.

Murdoch died on 16 October 1995 while jogging in Auckland Domain.

References

1941 births
1995 deaths
Rugby union players from Auckland
People educated at Otahuhu College
New Zealand rugby union players
New Zealand international rugby union players
Auckland rugby union players
Rugby union fly-halves
Rugby union centres